Zdeno Cíger (born 19 October 1969) is a Slovak former professional hockey player, and currently hockey coach. He played for the National Hockey League's New Jersey Devils, Edmonton Oilers, New York Rangers and Tampa Bay Lightning. Zdeno Cíger was drafted 54th overall in the 1988 NHL Entry Draft by the New Jersey Devils as their 3rd choice. Cíger played in 352 NHL games, amassing 94 goals and 134 assists. His best year came up in 1995-1996 season when he scored 31 goals and added 39 assists, after which he would leave the NHL before briefly returning 6 years later during the 2001–02 NHL season.

Achievements
 Bronze medal with Slovakia in 2003 Ice Hockey World Championships.
 Bronze medal with Czechoslovakia in 1989 and 1990 Ice Hockey World Championships.
 Team Slovakia - 106 games played / 34 goals
 Team Czechoslovakia - 43 games played / 13 goals
 Slovak Extraliga title with HC Slovan Bratislava in season 2006/2007

Career statistics

Regular season and playoffs

International

External links
 
 

1969 births
Czechoslovak ice hockey left wingers
Edmonton Oilers players
HK Dukla Trenčín players
HC Slovan Bratislava players
Ice hockey players at the 1998 Winter Olympics
Living people
New Jersey Devils draft picks
New Jersey Devils players
New York Rangers players
Olympic ice hockey players of Slovakia
Sportspeople from Martin, Slovakia
Slovak ice hockey left wingers
Slovak ice hockey coaches
Slovakia men's national ice hockey team coaches
Tampa Bay Lightning players
Utica Devils players
Czechoslovak expatriate sportspeople in the United States
Czechoslovak expatriate ice hockey people
Slovak expatriate ice hockey players in the United States
Slovak expatriate ice hockey players in Canada